This article lists the main modern pentathlon events and their results for 2002.

International modern pentathlon events
 June 27: 2002 CISM Modern Pentathlon Championships in  Hradec Králové
 Individual winners:  Vadym Tkachuk (m) /  Jeļena Rubļevska (f)
 Men's Team Relay winner:  Mihail Prokopenko
 October 10: 2002 Asian Games in  Busan
 Individual winners:  KIM Mi-sub (m) /  Lada Jiyenbalanova (f)

World modern pentathlon events
 July 15: 2002 World Modern Pentathlon Championships in  San Francisco
 Individual winners:  Michal Sedlecky (m) /  Bea Simoka (f)
 Men's Team Relay winners:  (Carsten Niederberger, Eric Walther, & Sebastian Dietz)
 Women's Team Relay winners:  (Lucie Grolichová, Alexandra Kalinovská, & Olga Zavorkova)
 September 23: 2002 World Junior Modern Pentathlon Championships in  Sydney
 Note: The junior men's event was not concluded properly. No idea about who was the champion here.
 Junior Women's Individual winner:  Olessia Velitchko
 Junior Men's Team Relay winners:  (John Zakrzewski, Arnaud Denfert, & Cedric Pla)
 Junior Women's Team Relay winners:  (Vera Feshchenko & Olessia Velitchko)

Continental modern pentathlon events
 Note: There is a discrepancy between Santo Domingo (June) and Rio de Janeiro (October), in terms of the Pan American MP host city here.
 April 17: 2002 European Youth "A" Modern Pentathlon Championships in  Athens
 Youth Winner:  Ádám Marosi
 April 25: 2002 South American Modern Pentathlon Championships in  Buenos Aires
 Men's Individual winner:  Horacio de la Vega
 Men's Team Relay winners:  (Cristian Bustos, Javier Tisi, & Cristian Carrasco)
 May 14: 2002 Asian Modern Pentathlon Championships in  Tokyo
 Individual winners:  Qian Zhenhua (m) /  Dong Le'an (f)
 Men's Team Relay winners:  (Mazura Okada, Yoshinori Mizouchi, & Shoji Kurousu)
 Women's Team Relay winners:  (Lada Jiyenbalanova, Lyudmila Shumilova, & Natalia Uvarova)
 June 14 & 15: 2002 NORCECA (Pan American) Modern Pentathlon Championships in  Santo Domingo
 Women's Individual winner:  Miranda Dominguez
 Men's Team Relay winners:  (5 different team members here)
 Women's Team Relay winner:  Cynthia Soto
 June 18: 2002 European Modern Pentathlon Championships in  Ústí nad Labem
 Individual winners:  Libor Capalini (m) /  Claudia Corsini (f)
 Men's Team Relay winners:  (Edvinas Krungolcas, Tadas Zemaitis, & Andrejus Zadneprovskis)
 Women's Team Relay winners:  (Sara Bertoli, Claudia Cerutti, & Claudia Corsini)
 July 2: 2002 European Junior Modern Pentathlon Championships in  Budapest
 Junior Individual winners:  Steffen Gebhardt (m) /  Tatiana Gorliak (f)
 Junior Men's Team Relay winners:  (Cedric Pla, John Zakrzewski, & Arnaud Denfert)
 Junior Women's Team Relay winners:  (Eva Sasvari, Reka Kling, & Vivien Mathe)
 July 26: 2002 European Youth "B" Modern Pentathlon Championships in  Eaubonne
 Youth Individual winners:  Jaime López (m) /  Aleksandra Sadovnikova (f)
 Youth Men's Team Relay winners:  (Lukasz Lis, Radoslaw Slomian, & Szymon Staśkiewicz)
 Youth Women's Team Relay winners:  (Eszter Tóth, Ildiko Hidvegi, & Katalin Prill)
 October 24: 2002 Pan American Modern Pentathlon Championships in  Rio de Janeiro
 Individual winners:  Andres Sanches (m) /  Monica Fling (f)

2002 Modern Pentathlon World Cup
 Note: The MPWC #1 event here has two men as champions by the UIPM.
 March 14: MPWC #1 in  Mexico City
 Men's Individual winners:  Viktor Horváth (#1) /  Ádám Marosi (#2)
 Women's Individual winner:  Katalin Partics
 April 4: MPWC #2 in  Madrid
 Individual winners:  Viktor Horváth (m) /  Georgina Harland (f)
 April 25: MPWC #3 for Women in  Székesfehérvár
 Winner:  Zsuzsanna Vörös
 April 28: MPWC #3 for Men in  Sindelfingen
 Winner:  Libor Capalini
 May 9: MPWC #4 for Men in  Budapest
 Winner:  Edvinas Krungolcas
 June 1: MPWC #4 for Women in  Warsaw
 Winner:  Bea Simoka
 August 11: MPWC #5 (final) in  Budapest
 Individual winners:  Andrejus Zadneprovskis (m) /  Claudia Corsini (f)

References

External links
 Union Internationale de Pentathlon Moderne Website (UIPM)

 
Modern pentathlon
2002 in sports